Power Dive is a 1941 American film directed by James P. Hogan. The film stars Richard Arlen, Jean Parker and Helen Mack.

Power Dive was the first film from the producing team of Pine-Thomas Productions, former press agents who had a producing unit at Paramount.

Plot
Ace test pilot Bradley Farrell (Richard Arlen), flying for McMasters Aviation Corp., breaks his leg when an overweight prototype crashes. Brad's younger brother Douglas (Don Castle), a recent graduate in aeronautical engineering, thinks Doug's flying is too dangerous and is hired as a design engineer at McMasters. Carol Blake (Jean Parker) wants to interest Brad in her father's design for an aircraft made of plastic. Doug pretends to be Brad because he is attracted to her but Brad meets Carol and takes her out flying. She introduces him to her blind father, Professor Blake (Thomas W. Ross), resulting in Brad becoming immersed in the professor's new designs.

Brad's friend, Johnny Coles (Louis Jean Heydt), loses his life test flying his own, similar design,  that breaks apart in the air, leaving behind his wife and child. Despite his friend's death, Brad convinces the company to build Blake's "geodetic" aircraft design, with his brother put in charge of the project.

After Brad returns from setting a new cross-country speed record, he proposes to Carol, but she is in love with Doug. Doug doesn't know Carol's true feelings and with the test of the professor's aircraft imminent, he is at odds with Brad over the new aircraft's design. Brad has to fly the aircraft for US Army officials but is worried that the heavy test equipment will make the aircraft dangerous to fly. Doug will fly with him on the test and when a 9g power dive is scheduled, Doug passes out. The test equipment breaks free, jamming the rudder. Brad forces Doug to parachute to safety, and then cuts the rudder wires, grabbing them with his bare hands. He manages to land the aircraft safely although his hands are cut badly. With the aircraft accepted, Brad gives up test flying to become a  vice-president of McMasters Aviation. Doug and Carol find happiness and marry.

Cast

 Richard Arlen as Brad Farrell
 Jean Parker as Carol Blake
 Helen Mack as Betty Coles
 Don Castle as Doug Farrell
 Cliff Edwards as Squid Watkins
 Roger Pryor as Dan McMasters, company president
 Thomas W. Ross as Professor Blake
 Billy Lee as Brad Coles
 Louis Jean Heydt as Johnny Coles
 Alan Baldwin as Young Reporter
 Pat West as Burly Mechanic
 Ralph Byrd as Jackson, fellow draftsman
 Tom Dugan as The Waiter
 Helen Lynd as Giggly Blonde
 James Seay as Army Radio Operator

Production
Power Dive was the first release by Picture Corp. of America, an independent production company formed in December 1940 headed by William Pine and William C. Thomas, former press agents and then associate producers at Paramount.

Pine and Thomas both worked in publicity—Pine was head of publicity for Paramount and Thomas was his assistant. They teamed with another publicist, Maxwell Shane, who was a writer. They decided to make lower budgeted films that did not have the overhead of the studios.

They talked with Richard Arlen, who had joined Paramount. Arlen became famous with Wings and suggested an aviation film. Arlen owned several planes and ran an aviation school; he offered himself and his aircraft for a movie. Pine and Thomas selected three titles, Power Dive, Forced Landing and Flying Blind, and wrote scripts around them.  They went to Paramount and said they had a star and three scripts and asked for a distribution deal. Paramount agreed, enabling Pine and Thomas to get loans from the bank to finance the films.

Power Drive was made in ten days at a cost of $86,000 and earned almost a million dollars. They saved money by shooting on location. Thomas produced the first film while Pine was an associate—he worked for Cecil B. De Mille. All three films cost under $90,000 and returned six times its negative cost. Paramount was so pleased with these results that it offered to finance the duo's films from then on.

Principal photography took place from January 23 to mid-February 1941 with some scenes shot on location at the Metropolitan Airport in Van Nuys, California.

Opening credits include the following statement: "Creative acknowledgement for technical assistance in use of Geodetic plane to the Plxweve Aircraft Corporation." A Phillips 1-B Aeroneer (NX16075) and a Player CT-6A (Plxweve/Greenleaf CT-6A) (NX 19994), made by Plxweve Aircraft Co., were featured in the film. Reviews noted that writer Edward Churchill had an aviation background and that star Richard Arlen was running a flyers' training school near Hollywood.

Reception
Power Dive was primarily a B film. Aviation Film Historian James H. Farmer characterized the film as a "fast-paced, low-budget formula film ..." Variety called it "... good program entertainment, taking full advantage of present interest in aviation and national preparedness."

References

Notes

Citations

Bibliography

 Farmer, James H. Celluloid Wings: The Impact of Movies on Aviation. Blue Ridge Summit, Pennsylvania: Tab Books Inc., 1984. .
 Pendo, Stephen. Aviation in the Cinema. Lanham, Maryland: Scarecrow Press, 1985. .
 Wynne, H. Hugh. The Motion Picture Stunt Pilots and Hollywood's Classic Aviation Movies. Missoula, Montana: Pictorial Histories Publishing Co., 1987. .

External links 
 
 
Review at Variety

1941 films
1940s English-language films
American black-and-white films
1941 drama films
American aviation films
Paramount Pictures films
Films directed by James Patrick Hogan
American drama films
1940s American films